The 136th Mixed Brigade was a unit of the Spanish Republican Army that took part in the Spanish Civil War. Throughout the war, it was assigned to the Guadalajara front, without having a relevant role.

History 
The unit was created on 1 May 1937 in Girona, from regular soldiers, militiamen from the Jubert Division, Madrid defense forces and confederal militias from Barcelona and Figueras. The command of the new 136th Mixed Brigade fell to Francisco Costell Salido and the brigade was integrated into the 33rd Division. Initially, the brigade moved along with the rest of the division to the Andalusian front, although in June it moved to the Guadalajara front.

In November 1937 the 136th Mixed Brigade was assigned to the 14th Division in Guadalajara, remaining in reserve, although on 6 December it was again located on the front line, covering the Cifuentes sector. On 10 February 1938 the brigade faced four enemy assaults against its positions in the Vertice Sierra and Cabezo Cano, managing to repel them. A few weeks later, between 1 and 6 April, it intervened in a small offensive on the Cuenca front that, however, did not bear the desired results. During the rest of the war, it did not intervene again in relevant military operations. At the end of March 1939 the 136th MB withdrew to Madrid, where it dissolved itself.

Controls 
 Commanders
 Francisco Costell Salido;
 Ramón Pastor Llorens;
 Eugenio Franquelo Ramírez;
 Bernabé López Calle;
 Mariano Román Urquiri;
 Pedro Monné Farreras;

 Commissars
 Rafael Sanz Lapis, of the PSUC;
 Isidro Albert Raigada;

 Chiefs of Staff
 Francisco Armengol Villalonga;
 Rafael Carretero;
 Serafín Gilart Fité;

References

Bibliography
 
 
 
 
 

Military units and formations established in 1937
Military units and formations disestablished in 1939
Mixed Brigades (Spain)
Militarized anarchist formations